The Los Angeles Dodgers are a Major League Baseball franchise currently based in Los Angeles. They play in the National League West division. The franchise joined the American Association in 1884 as the "Brooklyn Atlantics". They have been known in their early years as the "Brooklyn Grays" (1885–1887), "Brooklyn Bridegrooms" (1888–1890, 1896–1898), "Brooklyn Grooms" (1891–1895), "Brooklyn Superbas" (1899–1910, 1913), "Brooklyn Robins" (1914–1931), and "Brooklyn Dodgers" (1911–12, 1932–1957). There have been 20 pitchers for the Dodgers that have thrown 25 no-hitters in franchise history. A no-hitter is officially recognized by Major League Baseball only "...when a pitcher (or pitchers) allows no hits during the entire course of a game, which consists of at least nine innings. In a no-hit game, a batter may reach base via a walk, an error, a hit by pitch, a passed ball or wild pitch on strike three, or catcher's interference". No-hitters of less than nine complete innings were previously recognized by the league as official; however, several rule alterations in 1991 changed the rule to its current form. A no-hitter is common enough that, as of April 9, 2021, every Major League Baseball team has had a pitcher accomplish the feat.

There has been one perfect game thrown by a Dodgers pitcher. A perfect game is defined by Major League Baseball as  occurring "when a pitcher (or pitchers) retires each batter on the opposing team during the entire course of a game, which consists of at least nine innings. In a perfect game, no batter reaches any base during the course of the game." This feat was achieved by Sandy Koufax on September 9, 1965. It was Koufax's fourth career no-hitter, and is the franchise record for no-hitters by one pitcher. At the time, Koufax's four no-hitters was the major league record for any pitcher, but it was later surpassed in 1981 by Nolan Ryan.

Sam Kimber threw the first no-hitter in Dodgers history on October 4, 1884, which ended as a scoreless tie after ten innings. The most recent no-hitter thrown by a Dodgers pitcher was on May 4, 2018 by four pitchers. Walker Buehler 3rd career start 6 IP, Tony Cingrani 1 IP, Adam Liberatore 1 IP, and Yimi Garcia 1 IP. It was the first no hitter outside of United States or Canada as it was pitched in Monterrey, Mexico. It was also the first combined no hitter in franchise history. Five of the 20 pitchers were left-handed pitchers, 14 were right-handed, and one, Tom Lovett, is still unknown. In addition to Koufax, two other Dodgers pitchers have thrown multiple no-hitters, Adonis Terry and Carl Erskine. 18 of the no-hitters were thrown at home and eight on the road. The longest interval between no-hitters was between the games pitched by Hideo Nomo and Josh Beckett, encompassing 17 years and 250 days from September 17, 1996 until May 25, 2014. Conversely, the shortest interval between no-hitters was between the games pitched by Beckett and Clayton Kershaw, encompassing merely 24 days from May 25, 2014 until June 18, 2014. The San Francisco Giants (formerly "New York Giants") have been no-hit six times, the most by any Dodgers opponent. Dazzy Vance is the only Dodgers no-hit pitcher to have allowed at least one run. The most baserunners allowed in any of these game were by Terry (in 1886) and Koufax (in 1962), who each allowed five. Of the 26 no-hitters, five have been won by a score of 5–0 and four by the score of 3–0, more common than any other results. The largest margin of victory in a no-hitter was a 9–0 win by Hideo Nomo in 1996 and a 10–1 win by Vance in 1925. The smallest margins of victory were 1–0 wins by Terry in 1888 and Koufax in 1965.

The umpire is an integral part of any no-hitter. The task of the umpire in a baseball game is to make any decision "which involves judgment, such as, but not limited to, whether a batted ball is fair or foul, whether a pitch is a strike or a ball, or whether a runner is safe or out… [the umpire's judgment on such matters] is final." Part of the duties of the umpire making calls at home plate includes defining the strike zone, which "is defined as that area over homeplate (sic) the upper limit of which is a horizontal line at the midpoint between the top of the shoulders and the top of the uniform pants, and the lower level is a line at the hollow beneath the kneecap." These calls define every baseball game and are therefore integral to the completion of any no-hitter. There have been 24 different home plate umpires who have called Dodgers no-hitters; Babe Pinelli is the only umpire to have called two.

List of no-hitters in Dodgers history

References

Bibliography

No-hitters
Los Angeles Dodgers